Buwan ng Wikang Pambansa (Tagalog for 'National Language Month'), simply known as Buwan ng Wika ('Language Month'), is a month-long annual observance in the Philippines held every August to promote the national language, Filipino. The Komisyon ng Wikang Filipino (KWF) is the lead agency in charge of organizing events in relation to the observances.

Background

National language
Efforts to introduce a national language in the Philippines began in 1935 during the Commonwealth era led by President Manuel L. Quezon. In 1946, a language based on Tagalog was adopted as the national language; which was officially designated as 
Pilipino" in 1959. In 1973, Pilipino was formally renamed as "Filipino". Filipino and English were named as the official languages of the Philippines under the 1987 Constitution.

Linggo ng Wika
The predecessor of the Buwan ng Wika was the Linggo ng Wika ('Language Week'), which was established by President Sergio Osmeña through Proclamation No. 35 in 1946. From 1946 to 1953, the Linggo ng Wika was celebrated annually from March 27 to April 2. The end date was selected due to being the birthday of Tagalog literary Francisco Balagtas. 

President Ramon Magsaysay modified the dates to March 29 to April 4 in 1954. For the following year, the observance's dates were changed again by Magsaysay to August 13 to 19 through Proclamation No. 186. The change was made due to the older dates falling on students' summer break which meant schools can not take part in it. The end date was selected for being the birthday of Manuel L. Quezon, who became known as the "Father of the National Language". In 1988, President Corazon Aquino affirmed the dates through Proclamation No. 19.

Buwan ng Wika
In 1997, President Fidel V. Ramos through Proclamation No. 1041 changed the observance duration of the Linggo ng Wika to cover the whole of August. The name of the observance was changed accordingly to Buwan ng Wikang Pambansa.

Since 2019, the promotion of the country's other indigenous languages has been part of the observances in line with the UNESCO's designation of the year as "International Year of Indigenous Languages".

Observances and activities
The Komisyon ng Wikang Filipino (KWF) is the lead agency in charge of the Buwan ng Wika observance. The agency organizes events promoting the local language and Filipino nationalism. Schools customarily hold "costume" events as a culminating activity for the month-long event, where students wear traditional Filipino clothing.

References

August observances
Observances in the Philippines
Language observances
Awareness months
Buwan ng Wika
Filipino language
1997 establishments in the Philippines